Niastella vici  is a Gram-negative and aerobic bacterium from the genus of Niastella which has been isolated from farmland soil in Hunan in China.

References

External links
Type strain of Niastella vici at BacDive -  the Bacterial Diversity Metadatabase

Chitinophagia
Bacteria described in 2016